Amir Dervišević (born 4 July 1992) is a Slovenian professional footballer who plays as a midfielder.

Club career
On 11 September 2021, Dervišević moved abroad for the first time in his career and signed with Indian Super League side SC East Bengal. After making eight league appearances and scoring two goals, he left the club on 25 January 2022.

Career statistics

Club

International

Honours
Maribor
Slovenian PrvaLiga: 2013–14, 2014–15, 2018–19
Slovenian Cup: 2015–16
Slovenian Supercup: 2013, 2014

References

External links
NZS profile 

1992 births
Living people
Footballers from Ljubljana
Slovenian people of Bosnia and Herzegovina descent
Slovenian footballers
Association football midfielders
Slovenia youth international footballers
Slovenia under-21 international footballers
Slovenia international footballers
NK IB 1975 Ljubljana players
NK Krka players
NK Maribor players
East Bengal Club players
Slovenian Second League players
Slovenian PrvaLiga players
Indian Super League players
Slovenian expatriate footballers
Slovenian expatriate sportspeople in India
Expatriate footballers in India
Bosniaks of Slovenia